Amblyseius denticulosus is a species of mite in the family Phytoseiidae.

References

denticulosus
Articles created by Qbugbot
Animals described in 1962